Amine Ltaïef (born 4 July 1984, in Tunis) is a retired Tunisian footballer who played as a striker.

He was part of the Tunisian 2004 Olympic football team, who exited in the first round, finishing third in group C, behind group and gold medal winners Argentina and runners-up Australia. He was also in the 2006 African Cup of Nations squad.

References

Amine Ltaïef at Footballdatabase

1984 births
Living people
Tunisian footballers
Tunisian expatriate footballers
Footballers at the 2004 Summer Olympics
Olympic footballers of Tunisia
US Créteil-Lusitanos players
Tunisia international footballers
Espérance Sportive de Tunis players
Étoile Sportive du Sahel players
EGS Gafsa players
CS Hammam-Lif players
AS Marsa players
Expatriate footballers in France
Tunisian Ligue Professionnelle 1 players
Association football forwards